Henri A. G. Blocher (born September 3, 1937 in Leiden, Netherlands) is a French Baptist evangelical theologian.

Biography
Blocher earned a B.D. degree from Gordon Divinity School (1959).

Ministry
In 1961, he became a professor at the Biblical Institute of Nogent-sur-Marne until 2016. In 1965, he became professor of systematic theology at the :fr:Faculté libre de théologie évangélique de Vaux-sur-Seine in Vaux-sur-Seine, in France, until 2003, of which he is one of the honorary deans. In 2003, he became professor of systematic theology at Wheaton College in Wheaton (Illinois) until 2008.

Blocher was involved with the Lausanne Committee on World Evangelisation from 1975 to 1980 and is connected to a number of Evangelical groups and colleges around the world.

He is the author of many articles and several books on a variety of theological topics. 

Blocher is a proponent of the framework interpretation of the Genesis creation account.

Recognition
He was awarded an honorary doctorate from Westminster Theological Seminary in 2014, where he also gave the commencement address.

Publications
 Original Sin: Illuminating the Riddle, InterVarsity Press (January 2001) 
 In the Beginning: The Opening Chapters of Genesis, InterVarsity Press (November 1984) 
 Evil and the Cross : An Analytical Look at the Problem of Pain, Kregel Publications (March 2005) 
 "The Analogy of Faith in the Study of Scripture," in The Challenge of Evangelical Theology (Edinburgh: Rutherford House, 1987) 
 La Doctrine du péché et de la rédemption, Vaux-sur-Seine, Edifac (March 2001) 
 La Doctrine du Christ, Vaux-sur-Seine, Edifac (March 2002) 
 La Bible au microscope: Exégèse et théologie biblique, vol. 1, Vaux-sur-Seine, Edifac (March 2006)

References

External links 
 Lectures by Blocher

Baptist theologians
French academics
Living people
Wheaton College (Illinois) faculty
1937 births